Mark Herrera (born 20 March 1984) is a Maltese born athlete who competes on behalf of the Republic of Malta. He is the Maltese 3000 metre steeplechase record holder. Herrera attended the University of Malta from which he graduated in 2006 with a B.Sc.(Hons) Information Technology.

Personal bests 
Outdoor

 400 metres – 53.48 (Marsa, 25 June 2016)
 400 metres Hurdles – 64.03 (Marsa, 26 June 2016)
 800 metres – 1:54.43 (Marsa, 23 April 2005)
 1500 metres – 3:56.20 (Erfurt, 15 July 2005)
 3000 metres – 8:53.60 (Marsa, 25 February 2006)
 3000 metres steeplechase – 9:31.78 (Marsa, 13 May 2015)
 Javelin Throw – 32.25 (Marsa, 25 June 2017)

References 

1984 births
Living people
Maltese male sprinters
People from Santa Venera
Athletes (track and field) at the 2015 European Games
European Games competitors for Malta
University of Malta alumni